The Ugra is a river in Smolensk and Kaluga Oblasts in Russia, left tributary of the Oka. The east-flowing Ugra joins the north-flowing Oka at Kaluga and the united river, called the Oka, continues east to the Volga. In the 16th century, the Ugra-Oka confluence was the western end of a line of forts protecting Muscovy from Tatar raids. The river is known for the Great stand on the Ugra River. It is frozen from late November (sometimes as late as January) until the end of March. 60% of its annual flow is snowmelt, mostly in April.

A part of the valley of the Ugra located in Kaluga Oblast belongs to Ugra National Park.

References

External links

The Ugra River: photos

Rivers of Kaluga Oblast
Rivers of Smolensk Oblast